Lagger is a surname. Notable people with the surname include:

 Ed Lagger (1912–1981), American baseball player
 Goffredo Lagger (1901–?), Italian biathlete
 Peter Lagger (1930–1979), Swiss bass singer

See also
 Lag (disambiguation)
 Lager (disambiguation)
 Laggers Point